Fatimata Gandigui Mariko, better known as Fati Mariko (born 1964), is a Nigerien singer.

Mariko received her education in Niamey and Bougouni and developed her typing skills before becoming a musician. Her hit song "Djana-Djana", produced with the group Marhaba and released in 1986, brought her first fame. Mariko has sustained her career as a hit singer for over three decades, sometimes partnering with male stars and hip-hop groups in her productions. Her music is mainly derived from Zarma-Songhay ritual and folk music. She sings in French and in various native languages of Niger, including Hausa, Djerma, and Fula. Her albums include Issa Haro and Inch Allah.

References

1964 births
Living people
20th-century Nigerien women singers
21st-century Nigerien women singers